Two ships in the United States Navy have been named USS Tucker for Officer Samuel Tucker.

  was the lead ship of her class of destroyers, commissioned in 1916, served in World War I, transferred to the United States Coast Guard as USCGC Tucker (CG-23) and struck in 1936.
  was a  destroyer, commissioned in 1936, served in World War II, and sank following hitting a mine in August 1942.

See also

United States Navy ship names